The Chandler Motor  Car Company produced automobiles in the United States of America during the 1910s and 1920s.

Corporate strategy
It was incorporated in 1913, with Frederick C. Chandler as President, headquartered and with its factory in Cleveland, Ohio. Chandler was a former designer for the Lozier Motor Company, a top end luxury automobile manufacturer. Chandler and several other Lozier executives left the company to form his company.

Chandler concentrated on producing a good quality motor-car within the price range of middle class Americans. Chandlers were well received in the marketplace.

Production
In 1920, Chandler had a line of six cars, ranging from $1995 to $3595. This grew to 10 by 1922, ranging from $1495 to $2375. Like many other medium-price carmakers, in the middle 1920s Chandler introduced a lower-priced "companion car" called the Cleveland. In 1924, they introduced the "Traffic Transmission," a constant-mesh gearbox that reduced the need for extra clutching when downshifting. This was several years before General Motors offered the "Synchro-Mesh" transmission, which allowed the driver to shift into first gear while moving forward at low speeds.

Chandler's peak year was 1927, when they sold 20,000 cars. Hopes for continued growth of the market led to overexpansion by the company the following year, which finished 1928 over half a million dollars in debt.

In 1929, Chandler Motor Company was purchased by its expanding competitor Hupp Motor Car Company for its factory and manufacturing facilities, and the brand was discontinued.

Chandler, like most cars built before all-steel bodies became the industry standard in the mid-1930s, used bodies built with a metal skin around a wooden frame (an "armored wood" frame). Due to the use of fabric roofs, after a few decades the wood tended to rot; because of this Chandlers have survived in smaller numbers than some other popular automobiles of the era that used all-steel bodies.

Production models
 Chandler Light Weight Model 19 Touring 1919
 Chandler Metropolitan Sedan, 1922

References 

Manufacturing companies based in Cleveland
Vehicle manufacturing companies established in 1913
Motor vehicle manufacturers based in Ohio
Defunct motor vehicle manufacturers of the United States
Defunct manufacturing companies based in Ohio
Historic American Engineering Record in Ohio
Hupmobile
1913 establishments in Ohio
Vehicle manufacturing companies disestablished in 1929
1929 disestablishments in Ohio